Cypress is a city in northwestern Orange County within Southern California. Its population was 50,151 at the 2020 census.

History

Cypress originally was nicknamed "Waterville" due to the preponderance of artesian wells in the area, but was incorporated under the name Dairy City in 1956 by local dairy farmers as a means of staving off developers and to preserve their dairies, much like the then-neighboring cities of Dairy Valley in Cerritos and Dairyland in La Palma. After World War II, however, the land became too valuable for farming or ranching, and the dairies gradually sold out to housing developers during the 1960s, so that by the 1970s no dairies remained. Many of the dairymen moved their operations to Chino, where development is once again pushing them out of the area.

In 1957 local residents voted to change the name of "Dairy City" to "Cypress". The name was taken from Cypress Elementary School (originally built in 1895) which took its name from the Cypress trees planted to protect the schoolhouse from the seasonal Santa Ana winds. Cypress Elementary School also provided the name for new Pacific Electric Railway station on Walker Street at Lincoln Avenue when the Santa Ana Line was completed in 1906, as "Waterville" already had been used elsewhere in the system.

In 1981, the City of Cypress inaugurated an annual birthday celebration for the city. The event, the Cypress Community Festival, currently may be the largest single-day event of its kind in Orange County, California. The Cypress Community Festival is held annually on the 4th Saturday in July at Oak Knoll Park, located adjacent to the Cypress Community Center at 5700 Orange Avenue, between Valley View Street and Walker Avenue.

Geography

Demographics

2010
At the 2010 census Cypress had a population of 47,802. The racial makeup of Cypress was 26,000 (54.4%) White (43.6% Non-Hispanic White), 1,444 (3.0%) African American, 289 (0.6%) Native American, 14,978 (31.3%) Asian, 234 (0.5%) Pacific Islander, 2,497 (5.2%) from other races, and 2,360 (4.9%) from two or more races. Hispanic or Latino of any race were 8,779 persons (18.4%).

The census reported that 47,300 people (98.9% of the population) lived in households, 502 (1.1%) lived in non-institutionalized group quarters, and no one was institutionalized.

There were 15,654 households, 6,481 (41.4%) had children under the age of 18 living in them, 9,602 (61.3%) were opposite-sex married couples living together, 2,203 (14.1%) had a female householder with no husband present, 833 (5.3%) had a male householder with no wife present.  There were 506 (3.2%) unmarried opposite-sex partnerships, and 86 (0.5%) same-sex married couples or partnerships. 2,401 households (15.3%) were one person and 1,005 (6.4%) had someone living alone who was 65 or older. The average household size was 3.02.  There were 12,638 families (80.7% of households); the average family size was 3.35.

The age distribution was 11,343 people (23.7%) under the age of 18, 4,700 people (9.8%) aged 18 to 24, 11,685 people (24.4%) aged 25 to 44, 13,913 people (29.1%) aged 45 to 64, and 6,161 people (12.9%) who were 65 or older.  The median age was 39.9 years. For every 100 females, there were 94.2 males.  For every 100 females age 18 and over, there were 90.3 males.

There were 16,068 housing units at an average density of 2,438.1 per square mile, of the occupied units 10,960 (70.0%) were owner-occupied and 4,694 (30.0%) were rented. The homeowner vacancy rate was 0.9%; the rental vacancy rate was 3.5%.  32,780 people (68.6% of the population) lived in owner-occupied housing units and 14,520 people (30.4%) lived in rental housing units.

According to the 2010 United States Census, Cypress had a median household income of $80,440, with 6.7% of the population living below the federal poverty line.

2000
At the 2000 census there were 46,229 people in 15,654 households, including 12,241 families, in the city. The population density was 6,991.1 inhabitants per square mile (2,700.3/km). The racial makeup of the city was 65.61% White, 20.81% Asian, 0.40% Pacific Islander, 2.77% Black or African American, 0.59% Native American, 5.44% from other races, and 4.38% from two or more races.  15.65% of the population were Hispanic or Latino.
Of the 15,654 households 38.8% had children under the age of 18 living with them, 60.0% were married couples living together, 13.3% had a female householder with no husband present, and 21.8% were non-families. 17.6% of households were one person and 6.6% were one person aged 65 or older.  The average household size was 2.93 and the average family size was 3.31.

The age distribution was 27.0% under the age of 18, 7.9% from 18 to 24, 30.2% from 25 to 44, 24.4% from 45 to 64, and 10.6% 65 or older.  The median age was 37 years. For every 100 females, there were 94.9 males.  For every 100 females age 18 and over, there were 90.5 males.

The median household income was $64,377 and the median family income was $70,060 (these figures had risen to $80,331 and $86,286 respectively as of a 2007 estimate). Males had a median income of $50,781 versus $36,337 for females. The per capita income for the city was $25,798.  About 4.6% of families and 6.0% of the population were below the poverty line, including 7.2% of those under age 18 and 5.1% of those age 65 or over.

The 2008 population estimated by the California Department of Finance was 49,541.

Economy
Real Mex Restaurants is headquartered in Cypress. The Los Alamitos Race Course is located in Cypress, even though it bears the name of its neighboring city of Los Alamitos.

Top employers
As of 2018, the top employers in the city are:

Government
The city uses plurality block voting to elect two sets of city councilmembers (in staggered terms).  The city council has received a letter written by attorney Kevin Shenkman that claims existence of racially-polarized voting within the city, which combines with this election system to result in a violation of the California Voting Rights Act.  The city council held forums for public input on how to respond.  The council reached a decision during the March 14, 2022, council meeting's closed session to have the city attorney send a response letter.  This letter disagrees with the claims and asks for more evidence.

According to the California Secretary of State, as of October 19, 2020, Cypress has 30,207 registered voters. Of those, 11,029 (36.51%) are registered Democrats, 10,226 (33.85%) are registered Republicans, and 7,514 (24.88%) have declined to state a political party/are independents.

Education
The city is a part of the Anaheim Union High School District and the Cypress Elementary School District.

Public schools:
Cypress High School
Lexington Junior High
Oxford Academy
Christine P. Swain Elementary
Margaret Landell Elementary
A.E. Arnold Elementary
Juliet Morris Elementary
Frank Vessels Elementary
Robert C. Cawthon Elementary
Clara J. King Elementary
Steve Luther Elementary

Private schools:
St Irenaeus Parish School

Cypress College is located in the city.

Notable people
 John Stamos - actor and musician
 Brian Tochi - actor
 Matthew Morrison - entertainer  
 Tiger Woods - professional golfer 
 Adrian Young - drummer of rock band No Doubt
 Jerry Quarry - professional boxer
 Troy O'Leary - Major League Baseball player
 David Fletcher - Major League Baseball player

References

External links

Official website
2005 Population estimates

 
Cities in Orange County, California
Incorporated cities and towns in California
1956 establishments in California
Populated places established in 1956